Charles Harvey may refer to:

 Charles Harvey (footballer) (1879–?), English footballer
 Charles Harvey (cricketer) (1837–1917), English cricketer and clergyman
 Charles Harvey (Indian Army officer) (1888–1969), officer in the British Indian Army